James Karanja Nyoro is an agricultural expert and economist trained at the University of Nairobi and London Wayne College. He is the current governor of Kiambu County after impeachment of Ferdinand Waititu A.K.A Baba Yao. He worked as Managing Director at the Rockefeller Foundation before venturing into politics. In 2013, Nyoro ventured into politics and unsuccessfully contested for the Kiambu gubernatorial seat when he lost to former Kiambu governor William Kabogo. In 2016, Nyoro was appointed as an advisor to the government on matters Agriculture and Policy. He was attached to the Deputy President office. In the run up to the 2017 polls, Nyoro declared interest to unseat former governor Kabogo. He, however, dropped his bid in support of Governor Ferdinand Waititu after an agreement under the United for Kiambu Alliance.

References 

Living people
Year of birth missing (living people)